Lennie Gallant's LIVE is the fifth album from the French-Canadian singer/songwriter, and also his first live album, released in 2000. The songs were recorded at three concerts held in November 1999. At the time, tracks 1, 3, 5, 6 and 7 were previously unrecorded songs. All other songs had studio versions previously recorded on other albums: tracks 8 and 15 from Breakwater, track 13 from Believing in Better, tracks 2 and 4 from The Open Window, and tracks 9, 10, 11 and 12 from Lifeline. Track 7 showed up on his 2005 album, When We Get There.

Track listing
 The Pull of the Fundy Tide
 Which Way Does The River Run
 La Valse des Vagues
 Peter's Dream
 Part of Me
 Coal Black
 Pieces of You
 Destination (Train Song)
 Slow Boat
 Lifeline
 The Band's Still Playing
 Meet Me at the Oasis
 Man of Steel
 Sound Effects - Waves
 La Tempete (Bonus Track)

Personnel
Lennie Gallant acoustic guitar, bodhran, harmonica, vocals
 Chris Church violin, percussion, vocals
 Adam Dowling drums, percussion, vocals
 Asif Illyas electric guitar, 2nd acoustic (track 7), vocals
 Shehab Illyas bass guitar, vocals
 John Scott accordion on tracks 3 and 11

References

2000 albums
Lennie Gallant albums